Epipactis helleborine, the broad-leaved helleborine, is a terrestrial species of orchid with a broad distribution. It is a long lived herb which varies morphologically with ability to self-pollinate.

Description
The flowers are arranged in long drooping racemes with dull green sepals and shorter upper petals. The lower labellum is pale red and is much shorter than the upper petals.

Achlorophyllous, white Epipactis helleborine plants have been found. Achlorophyllous forms tend to be shorter, as small as 17 cm.

Flowering occurs June–September.

Distribution
This species is widespread across much of Europe and Asia, from Portugal to China, as well as northern Africa.

In North America, it is an introduced species and widely naturalized mostly in the Northeastern United States, eastern Canada and the Great Lakes Region, but also in scattered locations in other parts of the continent. In the US it is sometimes referred to as the "weed orchid" or "weedy orchid" and continues to spread throughout the country to new areas including Michigan, Wisconsin, and the San Francisco Bay Area.

Habitat
Found in woods and hedge-banks and often not far from paths near human activity. It is one of the most likely European orchids to be found within a city, with many sites for example in Glasgow, London and Moscow. Sometimes spotted beside car parks.

Epipactis helleborine is known for its successful colonization of human-made or anthropogenic habitats such as parks, gardens or roadsides. These roadside orchids exhibit special features such as large plant size and greater ability to produce flowers. Pollination plays a huge role as pollinators such as Syrphidae, Culicidae, Apidae etc. possess greater species diversity and visits the flowering sites more in anthropogenic habitats as compared to native ones. The visitation rates along with the reproductive success of these orchids are higher in large populations as they are more attractive to pollinators.

Ecology

This species of orchid is pollinated by several species of Hymenoptera, particularly the common wasp, but also other species in the genera Vespula and Dolichovespula. Flowers release a sweet nectar to attract the wasps, which has an intoxicating effect on them. Eight populations of Epipactis helleborine in central Europe (Lower Silesia, Poland) had their nectar studied and they were found to contain naturally occurring oxycodone (as well as another narcotic-like opioid) in minute amounts.

Epipactis helleborine requires a mycorrhizal symbiosis to germinate successfully and remains partially dependent upon the fungus when plants mature, however it is not particularly selective among fungal species. Fungi associated with the live roots include Tuber, Helotiales, Peziza, Leptodontidium, Hydnotrya and Wilcoxina.

It has been suggested that the presence of this orchid species in a woodland is an indicator that edible truffles can be found there, but this is not always the case.

Subspecies
A rather long list of names have been proposed for subspecies, varieties and forms of Epipactis helleborine, far too many to list here. This is not unusual for such a widespread species. At present (November 2021) only the following are accorded international acceptance:

Epipactis helleborine subsp. bithynica (Robatsch) Kreutz - Turkey
Epipactis helleborine subsp. helleborine - widespread
Epipactis helleborine subsp. neerlandica (Verm.) Buttler - Great Britain, Norway, Denmark, Belgium, Netherlands, France, Germany 
Epipactis helleborine var. tangutica (Schltr.) S.C.Chen & G.H.Zhu - China
Epipactis helleborine subsp. tremolsii (Pau) E.Klein - France, Spain, Portugal, Sardinia, Italy, Algeria, Morocco

Naturally-occurring Oxycodone

According to a study published in 2005 by Jakubska et al. trace amounts of narcotic compounds have been identified in the plants nectar, namely 3-{2-{3-{3-(benzyloxy)propyl}-3-indol, 7,8-didehydro-
4,5-epoxy-3,6-d-morphinan and oxycodone. This is still debated however, as there is no evidence that such molecules could be readily biosynthesized.

References

External links 
 Den virtuella floran - Distribution
 Opioids in nectar

helleborine
Orchids of Asia
Orchids of Europe
Plants described in 1753
Taxa named by Carl Linnaeus